A list of notable sociologists from Slovenia:

A 
 Frane Adam

B 
 Katja Boh
 Darko Bratina

D 
 Aleš Debeljak

G 
 Andrej Gosar 
 Pavel Gantar

K 
 Taja Kramberger

L 
 Thomas Luckmann

M 
 Rastko Močnik

P 
 Jože Pučnik

R 
 Dimitrij Rupel
 Veljko Rus

S 
 Andrej Studen

Š 
 Igor Škamperle

T 
 Gregor Tomc

U 
 Aleš Ušeničnik

Ž 
 Slavoj Žižek

 
Sociologist